Demond "Tweety" Carter (born October 25, 1986) is an American professional basketball player who last played for Start Lublin of the Polish Basketball League. He played college basketball for Baylor University.

High school career
Tweety Carter had one of the greatest high school careers in the history of the sport while attending Reserve Christian School in Reserve, Louisiana.  In six years playing varsity Carter scored 7,457 points, making him the highest scoring high school player in U.S. history, leading the Eagles to five state championships. Carter was named McDonald's All-American, Parade All-American (third team), Jordan All-American, EA Sports All-American and MaxPreps All-American following senior season in 2006.  He was a 4-time MVP of the Louisiana State Tournament and named Louisiana "Mr. Basketball" in 2006.

College career
Carter committed to the Baylor Bears at the beginning of his junior year in high school. At the time, Baylor was going through the murder of student-athlete Patrick Dennehy and numerous NCAA violations. He started on the 2009–2010 team that went to the Elite Eight of the NCAA tournament.

Freshman year
Carter played in all 31 games during his freshman campaign and started the final 13 for the Bears.

Sophomore year
As a sophomore, Carter played in all 32 games and started the final eight. Scored season-high 22 points on 7-of-11 shooting from the floor, including a season-best 5-of-8 from 3-point range in a win over Prairie View A&M on December 31.

Junior year
In his junior year, Carter started 36 games for the Bears. Carter scored a season high 30 points including seven 3-pointers on February 21, 2009.  Carter averaged 11 points and five assists during the Bears' NIT run.

Senior year
During his senior year, Carter, along with transfer Ekpe Udoh, led  Baylor to the Elite Eight and was named fourth team All-American by Sporting News Magazine.  Carter scored in double figures in 23 of his 31 outings, including 14 games with 15 or more points.  He also had four double-doubles.

Professional career
In June 2010, Carter joined the New Jersey Nets for the Orlando Pro Summer League 2010. On September 27, 2010, the Oklahoma City Thunder invited Carter to their training camp. However, he was later waived on October 15, 2010.

On November 4, 2010, he was acquired by the Tulsa 66ers of the NBA D-League. In February 2011, he signed with BK Ventspils of Latvia for the rest of the season.

In July 2011, he signed with Bnei HaSharon of Israel for the 2011–12 season.

On August 7, 2012, he signed with Cibona Zagreb of Croatia. In November 2012, he parted ways with Cibona. In December 2012, he moved to Czech Republic and signed with ČEZ Nymburk for the rest of the season.

On August 8, 2013, Carter signed a one-year deal with s.Oliver Baskets of Germany. On January 17, 2014, he parted ways with them  and signed with ASVEL Basket of France for the rest of the season.

On November 9, 2014, Carter signed with SO Maritime Boulogne of France for the rest of the 2014–15 season.

On June 11, 2017, Carter signed with ESSM Le Portel of France for the 2017–18 season.

On December 13, 2018, Carter joined Kolossos Rodou of the Greek Basket League.

On August 6, 2020, Carter joined Benfica of the Liga Portuguesa de Basquetebol. He averaged 8.5 points, 2.6 rebounds, and 4.6 assists per game.

On June 27, 2021, Carter signed with Start Lublin of the Polish Basketball League.

References

External links

 Pieno zvaigzdes Pasvalys profile
 ČEZ Nymburk profile
 Baylor Bears bio
 RealGM.com profile
 Eurobasket.com profile
 Israeli Super League profile

1986 births
Living people
ABA League players
American expatriate basketball people in Croatia
American expatriate basketball people in the Czech Republic
American expatriate basketball people in France
American expatriate basketball people in Germany
American expatriate basketball people in Israel
American expatriate basketball people in Latvia
American expatriate basketball people in Lithuania
American expatriate basketball people in Poland
American men's basketball players
ASVEL Basket players
Basketball players from New Orleans
Baylor Bears men's basketball players
BC Pieno žvaigždės players
BK Ventspils players
Bnei HaSharon players
Basketball Nymburk players
ESSM Le Portel players
KK Cibona players
Kolossos Rodou B.C. players
Parade High School All-Americans (boys' basketball)
Point guards
S.L. Benfica basketball players
S.Oliver Würzburg players
SOMB Boulogne-sur-Mer players
Spójnia Stargard players
Start Lublin players
Tulsa 66ers players
Turów Zgorzelec players